Modicus minimus is a clingfish of the family  Gobiesocidae. It is found on coarse substrates consisting of mixed shell fragments and gravel and on beds of brachiopods. Graham S. Hardy described this species in 1983 with a type locality of the channel between southern Rangitoto Island and D'Urville Island, New Zealand collected at a depth .

References

minimus
Endemic marine fish of New Zealand
Fish described in 1983